David Moir, D.D. (died 1847) was an Anglican clergyman who served in the Scottish Episcopal Church as the Bishop of Brechin from 1840 to 1847.

Biography 
He was the minister of St Andrew's Church, Brechin when he was elected by the clergy of the Diocese of Brechin to be the Coadjutor Bishop to the aged Diocesan Bishop George Gleig in 1837. He was consecrated to the Episcopate at Edinburgh on 8 October 1837 by bishops Walker, Skinner and Low. In August 1839, he was conferred a  Doctorate of Divinity by Washington College (now Trinity College), Hartford, Connecticut "as a token of friendly recognition and intercommunion between the Scottish Episcopal Church, and her daughter Church in America." On the death of Bishop Gleig on 9 March 1840, he succeeded as the Diocesan Bishop of Brechin.

He died in office on 21 August 1847.

References 

 
  

1847 deaths
19th-century Scottish Episcopalian bishops
Year of birth unknown
Bishops of Brechin (Episcopalian)